Muriel Robin (born 2 August 1955) is a French actress and comedian. She won an International Emmy Award for Best Actress in 2007 and received a nomination for a César Award in 2001 and six nominations for a Molière Award.

Early years
Muriel Robin is the youngest of three children of Antoine Robin and Aimée Rimbaud, who owned shoe-shops in Montbrison. She had two sisters, Nydia and Martine. In 1960, the family moved to Saint-Étienne. When she was very young, she liked to make people laugh and dreamed of becoming a singer. After a lacklustre school career and a love of parties, she ended up failing her Baccalaureate twice in a row. Unsure of which career to follow, she started to sell shoes in one of the family's three shops, without being really motivated.

In 1977, aged 22, she left Saint-Étienne for Paris, taking a course in dramatic arts at Cours Florent, the entry college for the National Superior
Conservatory for Dramatic Arts, in Paris. She left as Conservatory Laureate, and returned to sell shoes again in Saint-Étienne

The 1980s
In 1981, she joined Roger Louret, whom she had met in Paris, in Monclar, with his theatre company, Les Baladins en Agenais. Notable people that she met there include Elie Semoun and Annie Grégorio.
In 1983, she returned to Paris with Annie Grégorio to work at the Petit Théâtre de Bouvard., where she also met Didier Bénureau. She came up against the authoritarian methods of Philippe Bouvard, but, even so, he gave her a part in a play he had written, Double Foyer. Following that, she played in a role co-written with Didier Bénureau, Maman ou Donne-moi ton linge, je fais une machine, (Mother, or, Give me your laundry, I am washing a load), in 1986, in Avignon, and in 1987 in Paris, at the Théâtre de Dix heures. The play was later shown in Monclar at the Théâtre de Poche.
She became known to the wider public, towards the end of the 1980s through a television programme called La Classe, broadcast by FR3 (which became France 3). Muriel Robin met and became good friends with Pierre Palmade. They created her first one-woman-show together, Les majorettes se cachent pour mourir, in 1988, directed by Roger Louret. This programme was a success and pushed Robin into the limelight.

The 1991s
During the 1990s, Robin appeared in numerous plays including Tout m’Enerve, Bedos-Robin a collaboration with Roger Louret, Feu la Ma La Mère, and On Purge Bébé. She also spent some time presenting her work on radio, on Europe 1, with her programme, Tout Robin.
In 1997, she obtained her first role in cinema, replacing Valérie Lemercier in Les Couloirs du temps : Les Visiteurs 2 by Jean-Marie Poiré. The same year she wrote and directed with Pierre Palmade in the play, Ils s'aiment,(They Love Each Other) played by Pierre Palmade and Michèle Laroque, which was a notable success with the public and received a nomination for the Molière for the Best One-Man-Show or Sketch Show.

The 2000s
In May, 2000, she announced that she would finish with the genre of the one-woman-show and concentrate on her profession as a comedian, but also that year, took her first big role in cinema in the eponymous role of Marie-Line, by Medhi Charef. Other roles on stage and screen followed, in the following years.

Support for charity
Between 1992 and 2007, Muriel Robin was active in supporting concerts by the Enfoirés given for "the Restos du Cœur" created by Coluche and of which she became a sponsor until 2007. In 2001 she became equally involved with the journalist Marine Jacquemin in "La Chaine de l’Espoir" (The Chain of Hope) organised by the French Medical Institute for "L'Enfant de Kaboul" (The child of Kabul), in Afghanistan. This hospital opened in 2005.

Theatre

Filmography

References

External links

French film actresses
French women comedians
20th-century French actresses
21st-century French actresses
20th-century French comedians
21st-century French comedians
French LGBT comedians
Living people
International Emmy Award for Best Actress winners
1955 births
Cours Florent alumni